Percy Gaston Humphrey (January 13, 1905 – July 22, 1995) was an American jazz trumpeter and bandleader in New Orleans, Louisiana.

In addition to his band, Percy Humphrey and His Crescent City Joymakers, for more than thirty years he was leader of the Eureka Brass Band. He also played in the band of the pianist Sweet Emma Barrett. From its opening in the early 1960s until shortly before his death, Humphrey played often at Preservation Hall, traveling internationally for performances with the Preservation Hall Jazz Band and his own bands.

Percy Humphrey was the younger brother of clarinetist Willie Humphrey and trombonist Earl Humphrey. His father was clarinetist Willie Eli Humphrey. His grandfather was "Professor" Jim Humphrey, who took the train from New Orleans to sugar cane plantations during the 1890s to teach music to children of plantation workers.

The Eureka Brass Band was  founded in 1920 by trumpeter Willie Wilson. The band's members included clarinetists Willie Parker, John Casimir, and George Lewis. In the 1930s Wilson became ill, during which time trumpeter Alcide Landry had nominal control over the band, but after 1937 Wilson's illness forced him to leave permanently. Trombonist Joseph "Red" Clark briefly became the leader, followed by Dominique "T-Boy" Remy, who led it from 1937 through 1946. Humphrey took over the band and led the group for the remainder of its existence.

The members of the band varied, usually having nine to eleven members. Typical instrumentation was three trumpets, two trombones, two reeds, tuba, snare drum, and bass drum. Reed instruments were many, including the saxophones that often are found among jazz bands, but the clarinet is characteristically the signature reed instrument of New Orleans jazz.

They recorded prolifically. Phonograph records and albums were made for Pax, Alamac, Folkways, Jazzology, and Sounds of New Orleans. A 1951 album,  New Orleans Parade, features Humphrey, trombonists Charles "Sunny" Henry and Albert Warner, and saxophonist Emanuel Paul. Their 1962 sessions, Jazz at Preservation Hall, Volume 1: the Eureka Brass Band of New Orleans, issued on Atlantic Records, features Humphrey and his brother, Willie, trumpeters Kid Sheik Cola and Peter Bocage, trombonists Albert Warner and Oscar "Chicken" Henry, Emanuel Paul on tenor saxophone, Wilbert "Bird" Tillman on sousaphone, snare drummer Cie Frazier, and bass drummer Robert "Son Fewclothes" Lewis.

After 1975, the Eureka Brass Band disbanded, but Humphrey revived the name for festival performances and other appearances. He continued to lead his own band and played with others at Preservation Hall until his death in New Orleans in 1995. His last performance was at the annual New Orleans jazz festival in April, three months before his death at the age of ninety.

Discography
 1953 Percy Humphrey at Manny's Tavern (Biograph)
 1954 Sounds of New Orleans, Vol. 1: Paul Barbarin & His Band/Percy Humphrey's Jam Session (Storyville)
 1961 Percy Humphrey's Crescent City Joymakers (Riverside)
 1965 Climax Rag (Delmark)
 1972 New Orleans to Scandinavia (SLP)
 1972 A Portrait of Percy Humphrey (Storyville)
 1974 Living New Orleans Jazz (Smokey Mary)
 1995 Jazz in Schloss Gracht (GHB)
 1995 Hot Six (GHB)
 1996 Percy Humphrey & Paul Barbarin (American Recordings)
 2000 In Italy (GHB)
 2014 Percy Humphrey and the New Orleans Joymakers (GHB)

References

1905 births
1995 deaths
Dixieland trumpeters
Dixieland bandleaders
Jazz musicians from New Orleans
American jazz trumpeters
American male trumpeters
Riverside Records artists
20th-century American musicians
20th-century trumpeters
20th-century American male musicians
American male jazz musicians
Preservation Hall Jazz Band members
Eureka Brass Band members